Qispi Q'awa (Aymara, qispi something glittering, q'awa little river, ditch, crevice, fissure, gap in the earth, "glittering brook" or "glittering ravine",  Hispanicized spelling Quispiccahua) is a mountain in the Andes of Peru, about  high. It is situated in the Huancavelica Region, Huaytará Province,  Pilpichaca District. Qispi Q'awa lies west of Wakan Q'allay.

References

Mountains of Peru
Mountains of Huancavelica Region